Kim Yoon-sung (born January 14, 1981), known professionally as Gaeko (literally dog's snout) is a South Korean hip hop recording artist. He and Choiza comprise the hip hop duo Dynamic Duo, which rose to fame upon the release of their debut album Taxi Driver in 2004. In 2015, he released his first solo album, Redingray.

Personal life
On May 14, 2011, in the middle of his military service, he married Kim Su-mi before returning to serve the rest of his term. The couple had a son, Tae-woo, in 2011 and a daughter, Seo-ah, in 2015.

Discography

Studio albums

Singles

Soundtrack appearances

Filmography

Television shows

References

External links

  
 

1981 births
Living people
South Korean male rappers
South Korean hip hop record producers
Hongik University alumni
South Korean hip hop singers
21st-century South Korean male singers
Rappers from Seoul